Sergei Aleksandrovich Sholokhov (born 6 September 1980) is a former Russian professional football player. Before 2004 he was known as Sergei Kocherga.

Club career
He played 4 seasons in the Russian Football National League for FC Avangard Kursk.

External links
 
 

1980 births
Living people
Russian footballers
Association football defenders
FC Avangard Kursk players